Catoscopium is a genus of haplolepidous mosses (Dicranidae) in the monotypic family Catoscopiaceae .

Taxonomy

The family Catoscopiaceae has traditionally been considered part order Bryales. However, phylogenetic analyses have found Catoscopium to be the earliest branching group in Dicranidae, as part of a grade of protohaplolepidous lineages. Catoscopiaceae are not currently assigned to an order.

Species

The genus contains the following species:

Catoscopium martianum 
Catoscopium nigritum

References

Moss families
Bryopsida